Norma Jean Beasler (born January 30, 1938) is an American country music singer who was a member of The Porter Wagoner Show from 1961–1967. She had 13 country singles in Billboards Country Top 40 between 1963 and 1968, recorded twenty albums for RCA Victor between 1964 and 1973, received two Grammy nominations, and was a Grand Ole Opry member for several years.

Biography

Early life and rise to fame
Norma Jean Beasler was born in Wellston, Oklahoma, United States, and grew up admiring country singer Kitty Wells, whom she considered her biggest influence. She got her start performing on radio stations in the Oklahoma City area; and by age 12, she had her own radio show on KLPR-AM. She toured Oklahoma with various bands, starting with Merl Lindsay and His Oklahoma Night Riders at age 16, followed by the Bill Gray Band at 18. Norma Jean was the Bill Gray Band's full-time vocalist, and made guest appearances with major country stars. Early on, she befriended soon-to-be country star Wanda Jackson.

In 1955, she got a regular spot on the ABC-TV show Ozark Jubilee in Springfield, Missouri, where she stayed for two years and first received national exposure. Host Red Foley suggested calling her simply Norma Jean, and she made it official in 1958;<ref>Sachs, Bill "Folk Tunes & Talent" (June 30, 1958), The Billboard, p. 46</ref> she also became known on the program as Pretty Miss Norma Jean. She met Porter Wagoner on the show, and in 1959, signed a recording contract with Columbia Records. A string of unsuccessful singles followed, and she moved to Nashville, Tennessee, where Wagoner invited her to audition for his syndicated weekly TV program, The Porter Wagoner Show. She became a regular on the show in 1961 and stayed for six years.
Norma Jean toured and performed across the country with Wagoner, and RCA Victor producer Chet Atkins signed her to a recording contract with RCA Victor.

Success in the 1960s
In 1963, Norma Jean released her first single with RCA Victor, "Let's Go All the Way". The song peaked at number 11 on the Billboard country chart. She released an album of the same name which spawned two more Top 40 hits, "I'm a Walking Advertisement (For the Blues)" followed by "Put Your Arm Around Her." Because of the singles' success, she was invited to join the Grand Ole Opry.

In late 1965, she released an album titled, Pretty Miss Norma Jean (titled after how Wagoner frequently introduced her on his television show). It was the most successful of her career, hitting number three on the Top Country Albums list. The first single from the album, "Go Cat Go", became a Top 10 hit, peaking at number eight. Two more singles were released, starting with "I Cried All the Way to the Bank," which also proved successful. After that, "I Wouldn't Buy a Used Car From Him", written by Harlan Howard, was another Top 10 hit, making her one of the most popular female country singers of the era.

From 1965 to 1967, Norma Jean produced a series of solid country singles and albums and continued to appear on Wagoner's show. On television she projected a wholesome image, contrary to her singing hurting and cheating songs relevant to her personal life, which included an affair with Wagoner.

Norma's biggest hit came in 1966. It was an unusual recording with Bobby Bare and Liz Anderson, "The Game of Triangles", a wife-husband-other woman drama that hit number five on the Billboard chart, and earned the trio a Grammy nomination.

Norma Jean left Wagoner's show in 1967 after marrying Jody Taylor (whom she later divorced), and was replaced by newcomer Dolly Parton, who went on to become one of country music's leading female stars.  Parton said later she had a hard time replacing Norma Jean, because she was so loved by country fans.

That year, her single, "Heaven Help the Working Girl" (an early feminist song) was a Top 20 hit, the last one of her career. Despite a lack of major country hits, her albums continued to sell, like 1967's Jackson Ain't a Very Big Town'', which peaked at number 11 on the Top Country Albums list.  She later struggled with alcoholism and became a born again Christian.

Discography

References

External links
Norma Jean annotated discography at Slipcue.com

1938 births
Living people
People from Lincoln County, Oklahoma
American women country singers
American country singer-songwriters
Singer-songwriters from Oklahoma
Grand Ole Opry members
RCA Victor artists
Country musicians from Oklahoma
21st-century American women